Mark Slavin (31 January 1954 – 6 September 1972) was an Israeli Olympic Greco-Roman wrestler and victim of the Munich massacre at the 1972 Summer Olympics.

He was the youngest of the victims at the age of 18.  He was taken hostage with eight other Israeli athletes. Slavin was shot by machine gun fire in a helicopter during a botched rescue attempt.

Slavin was born in Minsk, Belarus SSR, and had taken up wrestling as a youth to defend himself against anti-Semitic attacks. Slavin soon became noted as a talented wrestler, and won the Soviet Greco-Roman wrestling middleweight junior championship in 1971. Slavin had moved to Israel just four months before the Olympic games and he joined Hapoel Tel Aviv and the Israeli Olympic Team. The 1972 Olympics was due to be his first international competition for Israel, and Slavin had been considered Israel's most likely medal winner at the Munich games. He was the youngest Israeli Olympian competing at the games.

Slavin had been staying in Unit 3 at 31 Connollystraße in the Olympic Village, with fellow wrestlers Gad Tsobari and Eliezer Halfin, and weightlifters David Berger, Yossef Romano and Ze'ev Friedman. Slavin had been due to make his Olympic debut on the day heavily armed terrorists broke into the Olympic Village and captured him while the Olympic athletes were still asleep.

References

External links 
Mark Slavin Munich 11
 

1954 births
1972 deaths
Sportspeople from Minsk
Jewish Belarusian sportspeople
Soviet Jews
Soviet emigrants to Israel
Israeli people of Belarusian-Jewish descent
Belarusian male sport wrestlers
Israeli male sport wrestlers
Jewish wrestlers
Victims of the Munich massacre
Deaths by firearm in Germany
Olympic wrestlers of Israel
Wrestlers at the 1972 Summer Olympics
Soviet male sport wrestlers
Burials at Kiryat Shaul Cemetery